Base / Progetti per l'arte is a non profit artist run space established in 1998 in Florence, Italy, by a collective of artists who live and work in Tuscany. Base in an idea by artists for other artists.

Artist collective 
Base / Progetti per l'arte was founded by: 
 Antonio Catelani
 Carlo Guaita
 Paolo Masi
 Massimo Nannucci
 Maurizio Nannucci and Paolo Parisi

Currently Base / Progetti per l'arte artist collective is formed by: 
 Mario Airò
 Marco Bagnoli
 Massimo Bartolini
 Vittorio Cavallini
 Yuki Ichihashi
 Paolo Masi
 Massimo Nannucci
 Maurizio Nannucci
 Paolo Parisi
 Remo Salvadori
 Enrico Vezzi

Exhibitions
Since its foundation Base / Progetti per l'arte has presented site specific installations including: 
 
 Sol LeWitt
 Marco Bagnoli
 Alfredo Pirri
 Cesare Pietroiusti
 Niele Toroni
 Michael Galasso
 Jan Vercruysse
 Heimo Zobernig
 Luca Pancrazzi
 Marco Fusinato and John Nixon
 Ingo Springenschmid
 Paolo Masi
 Antoni Muntadas
 Robert Barry
 Luca Vitone
 Liliana Moro
 Claude Closky
 Remo Salvadori
 Pietro Sanguineti
 Liam Gillick
 Massimo Bartolini
 Mario Airò
 Eva Marisaldi
 Rainer Ganahl
 François Morellet
 Bernhard Rüdiger
 Nedko Solakov & Slava Nakovska
 Olaf Nicolai
 Kinkaleri
 Rirkrit Tiravanija
 Matt Mullican
 Michel Verjux
 Elisabetta Benassi
 Pedro Cabrita Reis
 Pietro Riparbelli
 Simone Berti
 Jeppe Hein
 Gerwald Rockenschaub
 Jonathan Monk
 Peter Kogler
 Carsten Nicolai
 Surasi Kusolwong
 Franz West
 Tino Sehgal
 Nico Dockx
 Grazia Toderi
 Armin Linke
 Davide Bertocchi
 Pierre Bismuth
 Olivier Mosset
 Stefano Arienti
 Erwin Wurm
 Thomas Bayrle
 Diego Perrone and Christian Frosi
 Hans Schabus
 Maurizio Mochetti
 Lawrence Weiner
 Amedeo Martegani
 Gianni Caravaggio
 Piero Golia
 David Tremlett
 Franco Vaccari
 Remo Buti
 Gianni Pettena
 Superstudio
 Lapo Binazzi & Ufo 9999
 Zziggurat
 Koo Jeong A
 Christian Jankowski
 Giuseppe Gabellone
 Martin Creed
 Ken Lum
 Nedko Solakov
 Richard Long

References

External links

Base Book, Firenze 2019

Italian artist groups and collectives
Artist-run centres
Contemporary art galleries in Italy